Alain Fremura (born 12 June 2001) is an Italian footballer who plays as a left-back for Follonica Gavorrano.

Club career
On 1 February 2021, he joined Serie D club Prato on loan.

On 13 August 2021, he signed with Serie D club Follonica Gavorrano.

Club statistics

Club

Notes

References

2001 births
Living people
Italian footballers
Association football defenders
Serie B players
Serie C players
Serie D players
U.S. Livorno 1915 players
A.C. Prato players
U.S. Gavorrano players